Kada Delić-Selimović (born 10 July 1965) is a retired female race walker from Bosnia and Herzegovina. Her former coach was Tomislav Stefanović from AK Sloboda Tuzla.

Achievements

References
 
 sports-reference

1965 births
Living people
Yugoslav female racewalkers
Bosnia and Herzegovina racewalkers
Athletes (track and field) at the 1992 Summer Olympics
Athletes (track and field) at the 1996 Summer Olympics
Olympic athletes of Bosnia and Herzegovina
Bosnia and Herzegovina female athletes
Female racewalkers
World Athletics Championships athletes for Bosnia and Herzegovina
Athletes (track and field) at the 1997 Mediterranean Games
Mediterranean Games competitors for Bosnia and Herzegovina